Sold for Tomorrow is the debut album of the band The Moog. A "Digital Only Bonus Version" song, "Hit Song" was included on the EMusic website.

Track listing
"Your Sweet Neck"
"Everybody Wants"
"I Don't Want You Now"
"I Like You"
"Never Hide!"
"If I Died"
"Anyone"
"Survive"
"Goodbye"
"Xanax Youth"

References

External links
 Sold for Tomorrow at MuSick Recordings webpage

2007 debut albums
The Moog albums